Ruth Peramets-Püss (since 1968 Peramets; 28 November 1927 Tallinn – 3 August 2005 Tallinn) was an Estonian actress and television presenter.

From 1955 until 1984, she worked at Eesti Televisioon (ETV) as a presenter. Popular were children's programmes where she acted as tädi Ruth ('aunt Ruth'). She played also in several films.

Awards
 1978: Meritorious Artist of the Estonian SSR.
 2005: Order of the White Star, V class.
 2005: Estonian Television Lifetime Achievement Award

Filmography
 Andruse õnn (1955)
 Jahid merel (1956)

References

1927 births
2005 deaths
Estonian television presenters
Estonian television personalities
Estonian film actresses
Estonian television actresses
20th-century Estonian actresses
Recipients of the Order of the White Star, 5th Class
Actresses from Tallinn
People from Tallinn